Alfonso Lizarazo (born Alfonso Lizarazo Sánchez in 1940) is a Colombian host and politician, he was the first host of Campeones de la risa, which in 1973 became known as Sábados Felices. He presented the program until 1998, when he was elected to the Senate of Colombia.

About Alfonso Lizarazo

Alfonso Lizarazo was born in Bucaramanga, Colombia. He started his career working on Radio when he was 15 years old. From 1972 to 1998, Lizarazo hosted and directed Colombia’s most important weekly comedy show “Sabados Felices” (Happy Saturdays, Caracol TV). The show still airs today for a total of 40 years on the Colombian airways, making it Colombia’s oldest TV show and national treasure.

From 1982 to 1998 Lizarazo also hosted, directed and curated the syndicated program “El Festival Internacional Del Humor” (International Humor Festival), presenting the most recognizable Spanish speaking comedians from Latin America and the world for an annual, televised Festival recorded in Bogota, Colombia. The Festival was co-produced with Caracol TV and the show was later syndicated throughout Latin America (16 Seasons).

“A town without a school is a town without a future,” reads the theme of Lizarazo’s Foundation “Lleva una Escuelita en tu Corazon” (Live with a School in your Heart Foundation.) For 30 years his Foundation built 320 Elementary schools in poor, small Colombian towns. Because of his longstanding recognition and commitment to social causes, Lizarazo was elected Senator for the Republic of Colombia from 1998 to 2002.

External links 
Caracol Televisión

1940 births
Date of birth missing (living people)
Living people
Colombian television presenters
Members of the Senate of Colombia